On 27 May 2005, a suicide bombing in Islamabad, Pakistan, killed about 20 people and wounded about 150 others. The attack occurred inside the shrine of the city's patron saint, Bari Imam, which is located in Noorpur Shahan, between the city's 3rd and 4th avenues. At the time of the explosion, thousands of Sunni and Shia Muslim worshippers were attending a festival at the shrine.

References

2005 murders in Pakistan
2005 bombing
21st-century mass murder in Pakistan
2005 bombing
Mass murder in 2005
2005 bombing
May 2005 crimes
May 2005 events in Pakistan
Suicide bombings in 2005
Suicide bombings in Pakistan
2005 bombing
Terrorist incidents in Pakistan in 2005